The year 1978 saw a number of significant events in radio broadcasting.


Events
 February 8 – Proceedings of the United States Senate are broadcast on radio for the first time.
 April 8 – Proceedings of the Parliament of the United Kingdom are broadcast on radio regularly for the first time.
 May 6 – Bob Kingsley, producer of the syndicated "American Country Countdown," takes over as host. He replaces Don Bowman, who had hosted for the first 4½ years. Kingsley will helm the program for 27 years.
 July – WHTT of Moline, Illinois but with studios in Davenport, Iowa switches call letters to WXLP and changes its format from country to album-oriented rock. The station adopts the nickname "97X."
 September 18 – In television, American situation comedy WKRP in Cincinnati (1978–1982), featuring the misadventures of the staff of a struggling radio station in Cincinnati, Ohio.
 October 7 – "American Top 40" expands from three to four hours. Several new features are added to the program, which is reaching its peak in popularity.

No dates
 Likely fall – WEMO (101.3 FM) of East Moline, Illinois switches its adult contemporary/MOR format to country music, and changes its call letters to WZZC. The new station, an ancestor to WLLR, stabilizes an FM country music format, which – except for a brief run in 1977-1978 on WHTT-FM (96.9 FM) – had been absent from the Quad Cities market for more than five years.
 Bill Ballance leaves KGBS for KFMB in San Diego, where he is to remain for fifteen years.

Debuts
8 March – The first episode of The Hitchhiker's Guide to the Galaxy - the radio series later to be turned into a book, a television programme, a game, and a film - is broadcast on BBC Radio 4.
3 July – The radio play Pearl by John Arden is first performed.
24 December – In Sweden, pirate radio station Radio FM in Stockholm goes on air.

Closings
29 January – Adventure Theater (a children's program, not to be confused with Adventure Theater, a 1956 anthology series on NBC) ends its run on network radio.
31 December – In Sweden, Frukostklubben ends.

Births
 March 23 – Simon Gärdenfors, Swedish cartoonist and radio host
 May 18 – Carolina Bermudez, radio personality on the syndicated Elvis Duran and the Morning Zoo program originating from New York on WHTZ (Z100)
 June 8 – Imad Kotbi, Moroccan radio presenter and DJ
 June 29 – Charlamagne tha God, American radio personality on The Breakfast Club
 July 18 – Annie Mac(Manus), Irish-born radio DJ
 October 31 – Ella McSweeney, Irish broadcast producer and journalist
 December 25 – Paula Seling,  Romanian singer and radio DJ

Deaths
 March 27 – Wilfred Pickles, English radio presenter (b. 1904)
 June 29 – Bob Crane, American actor, drummer, radio host and DJ (b. 1928)
 Donald McCullough, British broadcaster (b. 1901)

References

 
Radio by year